Bernard III may refer to:

 Bernard III, Lord of Lippe (ruled in 1230–1265)
 Bernard III, Duke of Saxony (c. 1140–1212)